Helen Parr (née Truax), also known as Elastigirl and Mrs. Incredible, is a fictional superhero who appears in Pixar's animated superhero film The Incredibles (2004) and its sequel Incredibles 2 (2018). Voiced by actress Holly Hunter, the character is a superhero who possesses superhuman elasticity, granting her the ability to stretch any part of her body to great proportions. Helen is introduced in the first film as an accomplished superheroine forced into retirement with the rest of her family after usage of superpowers is banned by law.

Development

Creation and casting
Screenwriter and director Brad Bird conceived Helen as a modern mom who "has to stretch in hundreds of different ways each day." Helen is voiced by American actress Holly Hunter. Bird considered Hunter "one of the finest actresses in the world", capable of playing a "sensitive" character who also has "a very sturdy center". Hunter, who had never voiced an animated character before, saw the role as an exciting opportunity to expand her repertoire. She was also drawn to the film by its unique and "unconventional story about family and human dynamics".

Characterization
According to Hunter, Helen has "total fearlessness" as a superhero, but also "a very strong, protective instinct" when it comes to her children, and an "innate desire to save others".

Regarding the choice to make Helen the star of Incredibles 2, Bird insisted that it was unrelated with the #MeToo movement, and was instead a choice that came naturally with how the writers wanted to progress the story.

Animation
The Incredibles was the first Pixar film with an all-human cast, which posed significant challenges for the technical crew. The muscular movements of Helen was a particularly difficult subject, as the character needs to be able to stretch, bend and fold into various shapes. Character supervisor Bill Wise stated that Helen's was likely the most complex rig Pixar had ever done to that point. A specific program was written so that she could twist and turn as needed. The original animation system had become obsolete by Incredibles 2 and as a result all characters, including Helen, were rebuilt using a new tool box. Her expanded role in the sequel meant additional work but also new opportunities for the animators. The tentacle rigs for Hank in Finding Dory were used as inspiration in order for Helen to stretch "much beyond what she did in the first film".

Powers and abilities
Elastigirl's primary superpower is elasticity, which allows her to stretch various parts of her body to many different sizes. This ability can extend to shapeshifting, as she can use elasticity to change her form and density, as when she morphed into a boat and a parachute. She can achieve superhuman levels of strength, durability, and agility using her elasticity powers.  Her only weakness is extremely cold air.  Upon being captured by Evelyn in Incredibles 2, she is put in a refrigerated room and warned that she will "break" if she tries to stretch.

In addition to her powers, Elastigirl is shown to be an exceptional acrobat, motorcycle driver, pilot, operative, investigator, and tactician, as well as a masterful hand-to-hand combatant and martial artist.

In order to determine the Parr family's superpowers, Bird drew inspiration from the roles of typical nuclear family members. Helen's powers mirror society's expectations of a mother, who according to Bird is "always juggling a million things and pulled in a million directions".

Appearances
In The Incredibles (2004), Helen is seen as Elastigirl in the time before superheroes are banned. She married Bob Parr (Mr. Incredible) and starts a family: Violet, Dash, and Jack-Jack. She gives up her vigilante job to become a housewife while her husband worked. When Bob starts to act sneakily, Helen suspects an affair and confronts him. Later, when she discovered her husband is in trouble, she pilots a jet to rescue him, accompanied by Violet and Dash.

In Incredibles 2 (2018), the main plot of the film involves Helen becoming the face of a campaign to make superheroes legal again by giving them good public relations through successful missions that don't cause collateral damage to the city. Although she ends up becoming Evelyn's victim, she is then rescued by her children, with Helen finally learning of Jack-Jack's first of 17 superhuman abilities. Following that was a showdown on a plane between Elastigirl and Evelyn which resulted in a humiliating defeat, and almost death for Evelyn.

Critical reception
Rolling Stone ranked Helen the 14th "Best Pixar Movie Character", the second highest Incredibles character behind Edna Mode.

Syfy Wire praised the sequel for making its hero a "kickass mom".

Upon the release of Incredibles 2, there was some discourse surrounding the perception of Helen's character, and how it has changed since the release of the first film. Hundreds of fans on social media express their adoration for Helen's "thicc" body, a slang term referring to having large buttocks combined with a curvy waist, while The New Yorker compared the character to Anastasia Steele from Fifty Shades of Grey.

IndieWire ranked Hunter's work as Helen the third best performance in Pixar films, complimenting her "dizzying range" which "goes from sexy superhero to harassed, end-of-her-tether mom, to wife crushed by seeming infidelity, to back-in-the-game ass-kicker on a dime."

References

Female characters in animated films
Film characters introduced in 2004
Animated characters introduced in 2004
Animated human characters
Female characters in film
Fictional characters who can stretch themselves
Fictional aviators
Fictional women soldiers and warriors
Film superheroes
The Incredibles characters
Female superheroes